James Winchester (born August 6, 1989) is an American football long snapper for the Kansas City Chiefs of the National Football League (NFL). He played college football at Oklahoma.

Professional career

Philadelphia Eagles
Winchester signed with the Philadelphia Eagles as an undrafted free agent on August 11, 2013. He was released by the team on August 25 during the Eagles first round of roster cutdowns.

Kansas City Chiefs
Winchester was signed by the Kansas City Chiefs on March 13, 2015. On January 23, 2017, Winchester signed a five-year, $4.45 million contract extension with the Chiefs.

On September 17, 2017, in Week 2 against the Philadelphia Eagles, Winchester forced a fumble on a Darren Sproles punt return. The fumble was recovered by teammate Anthony Sherman and helped set up a field goal scoring drive.

Winchester won Super Bowl LIV with the Chiefs after defeating the San Francisco 49ers 31–20.

On November 23, 2021, Winchester signed a two-year contract extension with the Chiefs through the 2023 season.

Winchester won his second Super Bowl ring when the Chiefs defeated the Philadelphia Eagles 38-35 in Super Bowl LVII.

Personal life
Winchester is married with one son. His father Michael, who was a punter at Oklahoma from 1984–85, was killed in a shooting at Will Rogers World Airport in Oklahoma City on November 15, 2016.

References

External links
 Oklahoma Sooners bio
 Kansas City Chiefs bio

1989 births
Living people
American football long snappers
Christians from Oklahoma
Choctaw Nation of Oklahoma people
Kansas City Chiefs players
Oklahoma Sooners football players
People from McClain County, Oklahoma
Philadelphia Eagles players
Players of American football from Oklahoma